The 1st Annual Irish Film & Television Awards was hosted by James Nesbitt on 1 November 2003, honouring Irish film and television released in 2003.

Awards in film

Best Irish Film Jury Award
 Intermission (Winner)
 The Actors
 Chávez: Inside the Coup
 Dead Bodies
 Song for a Raggy Boy
 Veronica Guerin

Best Film Director
 John Crowley for Intermission (Winner)
 John Deery for Conspiracy of Silence
 Robert Quinn for Dead Bodies
 Liz Gill for Goldfish Memory
 Aisling Walsh for Song for a Raggy Boy

Best Short Film
 Meeting Che Guevara and the Man from Maybury Hill (Winner)
 Eireville
 The Last Time
 No, No, No
 Strangers in the Night

Awards in acting

Best Actor in a Lead Role – Film (Jury Award)
 Andrew Scott for Dead Bodies (Winner)
 Colin Farrell for SWAT
 Michael McElhatton for Spin the Bottle
 Cillian Murphy for 28 Days Later
 Aidan Quinn for Song for a Raggy Boy

Best Actor in a Leading Role – Television
 James Nesbitt for Murphy's Law (Winner)
 Peadar Cox for Ros na Rún
 Simon Delaney for Bachelors Walk
 Ciarán McMenamin for Any Time Now

Best Actor in a Supporting Role – Film/TV
 David Wilmot for Intermission (Winner)
 Colin Farrell for Intermission
 Ciarán Hinds for Veronica Guerin
 Gerard McSorley for Veronica Guerin
 Owen Roe for Any Time Now

Best Actress in a Lead Role – Film
 Angeline Ball for Bloom (Winner)
 Bronagh Gallagher for Spin the Bottle
 Maria Doyle Kennedy for Mystics
 Flora Montgomery for Goldfish Memory
 Natascha McElhone for Solaris

Best Actress in a Leading Role – Television
 Angeline Ball for Any Time Now (Winner)
 Dearbhla Molloy for Home for Christmas
 Joan Sheehy for Ros na Rún

Best Actress in a Supporting Role – Film/TV
 Ruth McCabe for Any Time Now (Winner)
 Brenda Fricker for Veronica Guerin
 Fiona Glascott for Goldfish Memory
 Deirdre O'Kane for Intermission
 Ger Ryan for Intermission

Awards in television

Best TV Drama
 Bachelors Walk (Winner)
 Any Time Now
 Home for Christmas
 On Home Ground
 Watermelon

Best Entertainment
 Amu Amigos "Amazon" (Winner)
 Brian Kennedy on Song
 Only Fools Buy Horses
 Ryan Confidential – Colin Farrell
 The Late Late Show special on Richard Harris

Best Lifestyle
 Amu Amigos "Amazon" (Winner)
 Ask Anna
 The Health Squad
 Ireland AM
 Wedding Planners

Best Children's/Youth/Educational/Multicultural/Religious/Regional TV
 Sampler (Winner)
 Cracking Crime
 Ear to the Ground
 Townlands: "Animal Rescue"
 Twins

Best Sports TV
 The Rod Squad (Winner)
 Breaking Ball
 End to End: "Armagh Special"
 La Ochra Gael
 When Joe Met Sam

Best Current Affairs
 Prime Time: "Cardinal Secrets" (Winner)
 Prime Time: "Saturday Night Sunday Morning"
 Crash
 Prime Time: "Sue Nation"
 Fine Gael: "A Family at War"

Awards across TV and film

Best Documentary
 Oileán Thoraí (Winner)
 A House Divided
 Bang! You're Dead
 Chavez - Inside the Coup
 Living the Revolution
 Sing on Forever
 The Strange Case of the Irish Crown Jewels

Best Irish Language
 Amu Amigos "Amazon" (Winner)
 An Charraig Stoite
 Galtymore
 Islandman
 Oilean Thorai

Best Music in TV/Film
 John McPhillips for Spin the Bottle (Winner)
 Gavin Little for God's Kitchen
 Ronan Johnstone for Home for Christmas
 Niall Byrne for On Home Ground
 ShinAwil Productions for You're A Star

Best Animation
 Escape (Winner)
 The Birth of John the Baptist
 The Butterfly Collector
 The Depository
 Pullin' the Devil by the Tail

Best Script
 Mark O'Rowe for Intermission (Winner)
 Conor McPherson for The Actors
 Derek Landy for Dead Bodies
 Liz Gill for Goldfish Memory
 Ian Fitzgibbon for Spin the Bottle

Best Cinematography / TV Photography
 Peter Robertson for Song for a Raggy Boy (Winner)
 Ciarán Tanham for Bloom
 Donal Gilligan for Dead Bodies
 Ken Byrne for Goldfish Memory
 Brendan Galvin for Veronica Guerin

Best Editing
 Dermot Diskin for Dead Bodies (Winner)
 The Actors
 Goldfish Memory
 Spin the Bottle
 The Strange Case of the Irish Crown Jewels

Best Hair / Make-up
 Linda Mooney & Carol Dunne for Watermelon (Winner)
 Lynn Johnston & Lorraine Glynn for Intermission
 Patsy Giles for Spin the Bottle
 Dee Corcoran & Ailbhe Lemass for Veronica Guerin

Best Costume Design
 Kathy Strachan for Spin the Bottle (Winner)
 Tara Van Zyl for Bloom
 Lorna Marie Mugan for Intermission
 Joan Bergin for Veronica Guerin
 Eimer Ní Mhaoldomhnaigh for Watermelon

Best Art Direction
  Padraig O'Neill for Spin the Bottle (Winner)
 God's Kitchen for Paki Smith
 Laurent Mellet for Headrush
 Mark Geraghty for Home for Christmas
 Tom Conroy for Intermission

Best Sound / Sound Editing
 Daniel Birch for Dead Bodies (Winner)
 Sarah Gaines & Philippe Faujas for Goldfish Memory
 Paddy Gibbons for The Twilight Hour

Best New Talent
 Colin O'Donoghue for Home for Christmas (Winner)
 Jonathan Forbes for Conspiracy of Silence
 Sonya Supple Gildea for Bodyblow
 Ian Thullier for Darkroom
 Sean Walsh for Bloom
 David Wilmot for Intermission

People's Choice Awards

Best Actor in a Film – Public Vote
 Colin Farrell (Winner)
 Aidan Quinn
 Stuart Townsend
 Cillian Murphy
 Pierce Brosnan

UGC Cinemas Best Irish Film – Public Vote
 Veronica Guerin (Winner)
 Evelyn
 Goldfish Memory
 The Actors
 Intermission

Best TV Personality – Public Vote
 Miriam O'Callaghan (Winner)
 Patrick Kielty
 Grainne Seoige
 Julian Simmonds
 Paidi O'Lionard
 Hector O'hEochagain
 John Daly
 Gerry Kelly

Lifetime achievement award
 Awarded to Neil Jordan

References

2003 film awards
2003 in Irish television
1